Henry Bell may refer to:
Henry Bell (architect) (1647–1711), English architect
Henry Bell (writer) (born 1989), Scottish poet
Henry Bell (engineer) (1767–1830), Scottish engineer, introduced the first successful passenger steamboat service in Europe
Henry Glassford Bell (1803–1874), Scottish lawyer poet and historian
Henry Nugent Bell (1792–1822), Irish genealogist
Henry H. Bell (1808–1868), American admiral
Henry Lawrie Bell (1929–1984), Australian Army officer
Henry Bell (American football) (born 1937), American Football League player
Henry Thomas Mackenzie Bell (1856–1930), English writer
Henry Hesketh Bell (1864–1952), British colonial administrator and author
Henry Bell (cricketer) (1838–1919)

See also
Harry Bell (disambiguation)
Henry Bell Cisnero (born 1982), Cuban volleyball player
Henry Bell Gilkeson (1850–1921), American lawyer, politician, educator, school administrator, and banker